The City Council of San Sebastián is the institution that governs the Basque city of San Sebastián (Spain). Its premises are located in the former casino of the city next to the Bay of La Concha.

Building
The building was built up in 1887 at the Gardens of Alderdi-Eder of San Sebastián, next to the Nautical Royal Club, to house the main casino. The opening ceremony was attended by the Queen Maria Christina of Austria. However, it closed as a casino after the ban on gambling in 1924.

On April 14, 1928, an agreement was reached to open in this building the Center of Attraction and Tourism, later this moving to a building next to the Hotel María Cristina.

On January 20, 1945, the council moved to this building. The architects Alday and Arizmendi amended the initial project in 1943 and turned the former casino into council. Until then, the City Hall was located in the Constitution Square (Parte Vieja), now headquarters of the Municipal Library.

City administration

After the democratic restoration in 1977 and after a brief period in which a municipal manager, led first by Ramón Jáuregui and subsequently by Iñaki Alkiza, took over the city government, the first democratic elections were held in 1979. Although lacking absolute majority, candidate of the Basque Nationalist Party (PNV) Jesús María Alkain prevailed for Mayor.

In the next term (1983–1987), Ramón Labayen took over his party fellow, also without absolute majority. However, San Sebastián became a stronghold of PNV's splinter party Eusko Alkartasuna, with its candidate making it to office at the next election (1987). They formed a minority coalition government with Euskadiko Ezkerra, which allowed it to remain as mayor during the term 1987–1991.

In 1991, Odón Elorza (PSE-EE/PSOE) became mayor, with the support of PP and PNV. With various covenants (with PNV and EA in 1995, with PP in 1999), he remained at the head of the council since then, and since 1999 with majority of votes and seats. After the 2007 elections, PSE-PSOE formed government with the municipal group Aralar-Alternatiba (formerly Aralar-Ezker Batua). In the May 2011 elections, Bildu's candidate Juan Carlos Izagirre won unexpectedly the elections, starting off a new period.

These are the mayors who have governed the city council since the 1979 election:

 Composition of the city council of San Sebastián since the 1979 elections

 Current distribution of the city council

References 

San Sebastián
City and town halls in Spain
Local government in Spain
San Sebastian
1887 establishments in Spain
Buildings and structures completed in 1887